Crassula vaillantii is a species of herb in the family Crassulaceae. They are succulents plants.

Sources

References 

vaillanti
Flora of Malta